Columbus Caldwell (September 25, 1830 – December 18, 1908) was an American farmer and politician.

Born in Charlotte, Chautauqua County, New York, Caldwell moved with his parents to Wisconsin Territory in 1836. Caldwell settled first in Kenosha, Wisconsin and then Rochester, Wisconsin. In 1849, Caldwell finally settled in Lind, Wisconsin. During the American Civil War, Caldwell enlisted in the 1st Wisconsin Volunteer Cavalry Regiment as a private. Caldwell served in the Lind Town Board and served as chairman of the town board. He also served as Waupaca County register of deeds and was a Republican. In 1873 and 1874, Caldwell served in the Wisconsin State Assembly. He was appointed the first commandant of the soldiers house at Waupaca, Wisconsin. Caldwell died in Waupaca, Wisconsin.

Notes

1830 births
1908 deaths
People from Charlotte, New York
People from Waupaca County, Wisconsin
People of Wisconsin in the American Civil War
Farmers from Wisconsin
County officials in Wisconsin
Wisconsin city council members
Republican Party members of the Wisconsin State Assembly
People from Kenosha, Wisconsin
People from Rochester, Wisconsin
19th-century American politicians